Erikssonopsis is a genus of fungi in the family Helotiaceae. This is a monotypic genus, containing the single species Erikssonopsis ericae.

The genus name of Erikssonopsis is in honour of Birgitta Eriksson (b.1934), a Swedish botanist (Mycology).

The genus was circumscribed by Michel Morelet in Bull. Soc. Sci. Nat. Archéol. Toulon Var Vol.195 on page 7 in 1971.

References

External links
Erikssonopsis at Index Fungorum

Helotiaceae
Monotypic Ascomycota genera